Breast Cancer Research is a bimonthly peer-reviewed medical journal covering research into breast cancer. The journal was established in 1999 and is published by BioMed Central. The editor-in-chief is Lewis Chodosh (University of Pennsylvania).

Abstracting and indexing 
The journal is abstracted and indexed in:
 CAS
 CINAHL
 Current Contents/Clinical Medicine
 Embase
 Global Health
 MEDLINE/PubMed
 Science Citation Index
 Scopus
According to the Journal Citation Reports, the journal has a 2017 impact factor of 6.142.

References

External links

Oncology journals
Bimonthly journals
BioMed Central academic journals
Publications established in 1999
English-language journals
Creative Commons Attribution-licensed journals